The northern masked weaver (Ploceus taeniopterus) is a species of bird in the family Ploceidae.
It is found in Democratic Republic of the Congo, Ethiopia, Kenya, and Sudan. All recent sightings in East Africa have been on the shores of Lake Baringo, Kenya.

Gallery 
All images below were taken at Lake Baringo.

References

northern masked weaver
Birds of East Africa
northern masked weaver
Taxonomy articles created by Polbot
Taxa named by Ludwig Reichenbach